Kitsman (older  or) is a city located in Chernivtsi Raion, Chernivtsi Oblast, in the historical region of Bukovina of western Ukraine. It hosts the administration of Kitsman urban hromada, one of the hromadas of Ukraine. The town is about 20 km (12 mi) northwest from Chernivtsi on the road to Zalishchyky. Population:

Name
The original name - Cozmeni - is derived from the Romanian/Moldavian surname ”Cozma” and had the meaning of "Cozma's kin settlement". Forming a village name from an existing name by adding the "-eni" suffix is widely spread an the Romanian speaking area. After the Habsburg annexation it was easier for the German speaking administration to use the "-mann" ending.

According other interpretations, the old surname Kitzman/Kotzman (and variations thereof) originated in Jewish culture, which had gradually become more common in parts of western Ukraine. The name was occupational and derivative of Hebrew roots; shortening the phrase kohen Tsedek ("priest of righteousness").

History

The first historical mention of Kitsman is dated to 1413, which also appears on the city's crest. Kuzmyn Forest (Codrii Cozminului), woods are situated between Siret and Prut valleys next to the town are named so, because they are traversed by the roads that connect Suceava, the Middle Ages' capital of the Principality of Moldavia, with what was then its boundary town of Cozmin / Kozmyn (modern village Valia Kuzmyna in Chernivtsi Raion).

Just before the Habsburg annexation of this part of the Principality of Moldova, both Romanian principalities (Moldova and Wallachia) - Ottoman vassals - were invaded by the Czarist Russia's army as a stage of a Russo-Turkish war. During the Russian occupation, Field-Marshal Count Pyotr Alexandrovich Rumyantsev ordered a census in these two principalities. According this census, the population in Cozmeni / Kitsman in 1774 was made of 105 Romanian families, one Jewish and 15 "Russian". The term "Russians" covered Ruthenians/Ukrainians, Muscovite Russians and Lipovans all together in the quoted census).

In the Austrian period (1774-1918), Kitsman (known as Kotzman / Kotzmann in German), as part of the Duchy of Bukovina, was the seat of the planning section of the district administration and it had a district court and a public school opened under the name of ”Moldavische Trivialschule” (German for ”Moldavian Elementary School”), where instruction was given in the Romanian language initially (1780s), then in German language (mid 19th century) and then Ruthenian (Ukrainian) language. From an ethnic perspective, the Austrian Empire supported Ruthenization - to keep the native Moldavians away from Moldova (1774-1859) and away from Romania (after Moldova's 1859 union to Wallachia to form modern Romania); while from an religious perspective, the Austrians promoted the Greek Catholic Church, to keep the population away from the other neighbor - Orthodox Russia.

The farmers from the 13 surrounding villages brought their produce to the market in Kitsman.

During the period of Romanian rule (1918–1944), the Romanian authorities viewed the Ukrainians (Ruthenes) as Ruthenized Romanians and attempted to reverse such a process by prioritizing schooling in Romanian. 

As a consequence of the Ribbentrop-Molotov pact, Romania lost North Bukovina and Hertsa region to USSR, process being wrongly associated with the Jewish population; thus Jews were seen by some as enemies of the state whose suppression was one of the goals of the state, while others (like Chernivtsi's mayor Traian Popovici) worked hard to save the Jews from deportation.

A local newspaper is published here since June 1, 1941.

In January 1989 the population was 9500 people.

In January 2013 the population was 6762 people.

Until 18 July 2020, Kitsman served as an administrative center of Kitsman Raion. The raion was abolished in July 2020 as part of the administrative reform of Ukraine, which reduced the number of raions of Chernivtsi Oblast to three. The area of Kitsman Raion was split between Chernivtsi Raion and Vyzhnytsia Raion, with Kitsman being transferred to Chernivtsi Raion.

Notable figures

Remarkably, Kitsman is the birthplace of several nationally well-known musicians including Volodymyr Ivasyuk and Ani Lorak.

Jewish community

Out of the population of 6000 that Kitsman had, approximately 700 (11.6%) were Jews who had immigrated from nearby areas of Galicia at the beginning of the 19th century and who dealt mainly with commerce in agricultural products. They also were occupied as craftsmen and were practically the only representatives of the intellectual professions. There were Jews in the ranks of the judges and in the bureaucracy. To name a few, Nathan Seidmann, a clerk in the planning section of the district administration in Kitsman who in his time as a member of the executive committee 2 during the years 1921 to 1927 and intermittently as chairman of the Zionist organization, performed notable service. Before 1914, the Jews and the Ruthenian (Ukrainian) population of the town and the surrounding villages co-existed in peace.

References

External links
 Site about Kitsman with photos and history (in Ukrainian)
 Kitsman museum of history and ethnography
 Heraldry.com.ua entry for Kitsman, Ukraine
 department of formation of city Kitsman'

Cities in Chernivtsi Oblast
Bukovina
Cities of district significance in Ukraine
Duchy of Bukovina